Daniel Ernesto Aguiñaga Contreras (born 14 August 1994) is a Mexican professional footballer who plays as a defensive midfielder.

Honours
Tepatitlán
Liga de Expansión MX: Guardianes 2021
Campeón de Campeones: 2021

References

External links
 

1994 births
Living people
Mexican footballers
Association football defenders
Atlético San Luis footballers
C.D. Tepatitlán de Morelos players
Loros UdeC footballers
Ascenso MX players
Liga Premier de México players
Sportspeople from León, Guanajuato
Footballers from Guanajuato